Fishing Creek is a stream in the U.S. state of West Virginia.
It flows into the Ohio River at New Martinsville.

Fishing Creek's name comes from the Native Americans of the area, who once fished there.

See also
List of rivers of West Virginia

References

Rivers of Wetzel County, West Virginia
Rivers of West Virginia